Performa is a non-profit arts organization well-known for the Performa Biennial, a festival of performance art that happens every two year in various venues and institutions in New York City. Performa was founded in 2004 by art historian and curator RoseLee Goldberg. Since 2005, Performa curators have included Charles Aubin, Defne Ayas, Tairone Bastien, Mark Beasley, Adrienne Edwards, Laura McLean-Ferris, Kathy Noble, Job Piston, and Lana Wilson. The organization commissions new works and tours performances premiered at the biennial. It also manages the work of choreographer and filmmaker Yvonne Rainer.

Performa Biennial

Performa 05 commissions 
In 2005, Performa hosted the first Performa Biennial, a series of performance events at venues and institutions across New York City. Founding curator and director, RoseLee Goldberg is quoted as saying her objective in creating the festival was "to produce new work that I'd never seen before and have the miracle of working with artists who would make things of wonder. The second was to deal with this history." Performa 05 presented new works by artists working in performance as well as first performance works by artists working in other mediums. The biennial also re-staged seminal performance works from history.

Artists Jesper Just and Francis Alÿs presented new live performances specifically commissioned for Performa 05 and the Solomon R. Guggenheim Museum presented Marina Abramović's Seven Easy Pieces, in which Abramović re-performed several works from the canon of early performance works, including two of her own. Performances included works by Gina Pane, Vito Acconci, Valie Export, Bruce Nauman, and Joseph Beuys. Other featured artists in Performa 05 included Shirin Neshat, Clifford Owens, Tamy Ben-Tor, Laurie Simmons, Wanda Raimundi-Ortiz, Coco Fusco, and Christian Marclay.
Jesper Just: True Love Is Yet To Come?, 2005 at Stephan Weiss Studio, 711 Greenwich Street, New York
Francis Alÿs: Rehearsal II at The Slipper Room, 2005 at 167 Orchard Street at Stanton Street
Performa Radio, 2005, on WFMU (91.1FM-NY) and WKCR (89.9FM-NY)

Performa 07 commissions 
Japanther, Japanther in (3-D), 2007 at Performance Space 122
Nathalie Djurberg, Untitled (Working Title Kids & Dogs), 2007 at the Zipper Theater
Carlos Amorales, Spider Galaxy, 2007 at 590 Madison Avenue (The Atrium)
Sanford Biggers, The Somethin' Suite, 2007 at The Box
Isaac Julien & Russell Maliphant, Cast No Shadow, 2007 at Brooklyn Academy of Music Harvey Theater
Daria Martin, Harpstrings & Lava, 2007 at Tribeca Grand Hotel Screening Room
Kelly Nipper, Floyd on the Floor, 2007 at Judson Memorial Church
Adam Pendleton, The Revival, 2007 at Stephan Weiss Studio
Yvonne Rainer, RoS Indexical, 2007 at The Hudson Theatre at Millennium Broadway Hotel
Francesco Vezzoli, Cosi’ e (se vi pare) Right You Are (If You Think You Are), 2007 at Solomon R. Guggenheim Museum

Performa 09 commissions 
Arto Lindsay, SOMEWHERE I READ
Jennifer Rubell, Creation
Guy Ben-Ner, Drop the Monkey
Christian Tomaszewski and Joanna Malinowska, Mother Earth Sister Moon
Omer Fast, Talk Show
Candice Breitz, New York, New York
Music for 16 Futurist Noise Intoners
Wangechi Mutu, Stone Ihiga
Mike Kelley, Extracurricular Activity Projective Reconstruction #32, Plus
Futurist Life Redux
Dominique Gonzales-Foerster and Ari Benjamin Meyers, K.62 and K.85
Yeondoo Jung, Cinemagician

Performa 11 commissions 
Elmgreen & Dragset, Happy Days in the Art World, 2011 at Skirball Center for the Performing Arts
Mika Rottenberg and Jon Kessler, Seven, 2011
Frances Stark, Put a Song in Your Thing, 2011 at Abrons Art Center
Gerard Byrne, In Repertory, 2011 at Abrons Art Center
Tarek Atoui, Visiting Tarab, 2011 at SIR Stage
Simon Fujiwara, The Boy Who Cried Wolf, 2011 at Abrons Art Center
Ming Wong, Persona Performa, 2011 at Museum of the Moving Image
Shirin Neshat, OverRuled, 2011 at Cedar Lake
Laurel Nakadate and James Franco, Three Performances in Search of Tennessee, 2011 at Abrons Art Center
Liz Magic Laser, I Feel Your Pain, 2011 at SVA Theater
Iona Rozeal Brown, battle of yestermore, 2011 at Skylight West
Guy Maddin, Tales from the Gimli Hospital: Reframed, 2011 at Walter Reade Theater
Ragnar Kjartansson, Bliss, 2011 at Abrons Art Center

Performa 13 commissions 
Paweł Althamer, Biba Performa, 2013, and Queen Mother of Reality Inauguration, 2013 at Socrates Sculpture Park
Rashid Johnson, Dutchman, 2013 at 10th Street Bath House, 268 East 10th Street
Ryan McNamara, MEƎM: A STORY BALLET ABOUT THE INTERNET, 2013 at Connelly Theater
Subodh Gupta, Celebration, 2013 at The Old Bowery Station, 168 Bowery
Florian Heckter, C.D. – A Script for Synthesis, 2013 at Solomon R. Guggenheim Museum
Alexandre Singh, The Humans, 2013 at BAM Fisher
Rosa Barba, Subconscious Society – Live, 2013 at Anthology Film Archives, 32 Second Avenue
Eddie Peake, Endymion, 2013 at Swiss Institute
Shana Lutker, The Nose, The Cane, The Broken Left Arm, 2013 at Theatre 80, 80 St Marks Place
Marianne Vitale, The Missing Book of Spurs, 2013 at 5-01 46th Road, Long Island City
Raqs Media Collective, The Last International, 2013 at Connelly Theater
Tori Wrånes, Yes Nix, 2013 at SIR Stage 37, 508 West 37th Street

Performa 15 commissions 
Ryan Gander, Earnest Hawker, 2015
Francesco Vezzoli and David Hallberg, Fortuna Desperata, 2015 at St. Bart's Church, 325 Park Avenue
Pauline Curnier Jardin, The Resurrection Plot, 2015 at Pioneer Works
Wyatt Kahn, Work, 2015 at Swedish Cottage Marionette Theatre
Jérôme Bel, Ballet (New York), 2015 at Marian Goodman Gallery; Martha Graham Studio Theater; and El Museo del Barrio
Robin Rhode, Arnold Schönberg's Erwartung – A Performance by Robin Rhode, 2015 at Times Square
Zheng Mahler, New York Post – et Préfiguratif (Before and After New York), 2015
Erika Vogt, Artist Theater Program, 2015 at Roulette, 509 Atlantic Ave.
Jesper Just and FOS, in the shadow/ of a spectacle/ is the view of the crowd, 2015
Juliana Huxtable, There Are Certain Facts that Cannot Be Disputed, 2015 at Museum of Modern Art
Oscar Murillo, Lucky dip, 2015 at Alexander Hamilton U.S. Custom House
Laura Lima, Gala Chickens and Ball, 2015
Agatha Gothe-Snape, Rhetorical Chorus (LW), 2015 at New York Society for Ethical Culture
Edgar Arceneaux, Until, Until, Until..., 2015

Performa 17 commissions 
Yto Barrada, Tree Identification for Beginners
Brian Belott, People Pie Pool at Abrons Arts Center
Xavier Cha, Buffer at Brooklyn Academy of Music
Teju Cole, Black Paper
François Dallegret, The Environment-Bubble (1965–2017)
Nicholas Hlobo, umBhovuzo: The Parable of the Sower
Flora Kasearu, Ainult liikmetele (Members Only)
William Kentridge, Ursonate at the Harlem Parish
Barbara Kruger
Kris Lemsalu and Kyp Malone, Going, Going
Julie Mehretu and Jason Moran, MASS (HOWL, eon) at the Harlem Parish
Mohau Modisakeng, ZION
Zanele Muholi, Masihambisane – On Visual Activism
Wangechi Mutu, Banana Stroke
Narcissister, The Body Is a House at Participant Inc
Kelly Nipper, Terre Mécanique
Eiko Otake, A Body in Places
Jimmy Robert, Imitation of Lives at the Glass House
Bryony Roberts and Mabel O. Wilson with the Marching Cobras of New York, Marching On
Tracey Rose
Anu Vahtra, Open House Closing
Kemang Wa Lehulere, I cut my skin to liberate the splinter

Performa 19 commissions 
Korakrit Arunanondchai, Together
Ed Atkins, A Catch Upon the Mirror at Abrons Arts Center
Nairy Baghramian and Maria Hassabi, Entre Deux Actes (Ménage à Quatre)
Cecilia Bengolea and Michèle Lamy, Before We Die
Yu Cheng-Ta, FAMEME
Torkwase Dyson, I Can Drink the Distance: Plantationocene in 2 Acts
Su Hui-Yu, The White Water
Tarik Kiswanson, AS DEEP AS I COULD REMEMBER, AS FAR AS I COULD SEE
Kia LaBeija, (Untitled) The Black Act
Lap-See Lam, Phantom
Shu Lea Cheang, SLEEP1237
Eva Mag, Dead Matter Moves
Paul Maheke and Nkisi, Sènsa
Gaetano Pesce
Paul Pfeiffer, University of Georgia Redcoat Band Live at the Apollo Theater
Huang Po-Chih, Heaven on Fourth
Yvonne Rainer, Parts of Some Sextets (1965–2019)
Bunny Rogers, Sanctuary at the Essex Street Academy
Ylva Snöfrid, Nostalgia–Acts of Vanitas
Samson Young, The Eight Immortals
Chou Yu-Cheng, CHEMICAL GILDING, KEEP CALM, GALVANIZE, PRAY, ASHES, MANIFESTATION, UNEQUAL, DISSATISFACTION, CAPITALIZE, INCENSE BURNER, SURVIVAL, AGITATION, HIT
Andros Zins-Browne and Karthik Pandian, Atlas Unlimited: Acts VII–X at 80WSE

Performa 21 Commissions 
Kevin Beasley, The Sound of Morning
Ericka Beckman, Stalk
Sara Cwynar, Down at the Arcade
Danielle Dean, Amazon (Proxy)
Madeline Hollander, Review
Andrés Jaque / Office for Political Innovation, Being Silica
Tschabalala Self, Sounding Board
Shikeith, notes towards becoming a spill

References

External links
 

Art biennials
Performance art in New York City